The following radio stations broadcast on AM frequency 1160 kHz: in the United States and Mexico. Radio station KSL in Salt Lake City is the dominant Class A station on 1160 AM, a United States clear-channel frequency, according to the U.S. Federal Communications Commission (FCC).

In Argentina 
 Independencia in Lanus, Buenos Aires
 La Mas Santiagueña in Gregorio de Laferrere, Buenos Aires
 LRA57 in El Bolsón, Río Negro
 LRH253 Cataratas	Puerto Iguazú
 LU32 in Olavarría, Buenos Aires

In Mexico 
 XEQIN-AM in San Quintin, Baja California

In the United States 
Stations in bold are clear-channel stations.

References

Lists of radio stations by frequency